The year 1767 in science and technology involved some significant events.

Agriculture
 Arthur Young publishes The farmer's letters to the people of England, containing the sentiments of a practical husbandman ... to which is added, Sylvæ, or, Occasional tracts on husbandry and rural oeconomics.

Exploration
 June 17 – British Royal Navy Captain Samuel Wallis becomes the first European definitely to visit the island of Tahiti in the Pacific Ocean, during HMS Dolphins second circumnavigation.
 July 3 – Pitcairn Island in the Pacific Ocean is sighted from HMS Swallow (1766) by 15-year-old Midshipman Robert Pitcairn on a British Royal Navy expeditionary voyage commanded by Philip Carteret, the first definite European sighting.
 Autumn – North Carolina woodsman Daniel Boone goes through the Cumberland Gap and reaches Kentucky (in defiance of the Royal Proclamation of 1763). He discovers a rich hunting ground, contested by several Native American tribes.

Technology
 January 1 – First annual volume of The Nautical Almanac and Astronomical Ephemeris, produced by British Astronomer Royal Nevil Maskelyne at the Royal Observatory, Greenwich, gives navigators the means to find longitude at sea using tables of lunar distance.
 July 3 – First edition of Adresseavisen, Norway's oldest newspaper remaining in print, is published.
 Coldstream Bridge on the England/Scotland border, designed by John Smeaton, is opened, one of the first long (300 feet (90 m)) bridges with a flat deck.
 Horace-Bénédict de Saussure constructs the first known Western solar oven.
 Joseph Priestley discovers a method of producing carbonated water and publishes The History and Present State of Electricity.

Awards
 Copley Medal: John Ellis

Births
 March 6 – Davies Giddy, English promoter of science (died 1839)
 August 24 – Bernhard Meyer, German physician and ornithologist (died 1836)
 date unknown – Bewick Bridge, English mathematician (died 1833)

Deaths
 February 19 – François Boissier de Sauvages de Lacroix, French physician and botanist (born 1706)
 March 20 – Firmin Abauzit, French scientist (born 1679)
 date unknown – Marie Anne Victoire Pigeon, French mathematician (born 1724)

References

 
18th century in science
1760s in science